Majka, Slavic-language feminine given name, originally a diminutive of the name Maria or Maja, it can be a spelling variation of Mayka.

Given name 
 Majka Jeżowska (born 1960), Polish singer 
 Majka Olkowicz, Majka (soap opera) character
 Majka, Dekalog: Seven character
 Mayka Mecheba, (born 1987), Guinean painter and football player
 Mayka Villaverde Freire, The Body (2012 film) character
 Mayka Zima (born 1992), New Caledonian tennis player

Surname 
 Jolanta Majka (born 1978), Polish rower 
 Marek Majka (born 1959), Polish football manager and player 
 Matěj Majka (born 2000), Czech football player
 Rafał Majka (born 1989), Polish road bicycle racer

Mononym 
 Majka (rapper) (born 1979 as Péter Majoros), Hungarian rapper

Other 
 Majka (soap opera)
 Nizhnyaya Mayka, rural locality (a village) in Mrakovsky Selsoviet, Kugarchinsky District, Bashkortostan, Russia

Feminine given names
Polish-language surnames